Darren Byler is an American anthropologist and author. He is assistant professor of International Studies at Simon Fraser University. Byler specializes in the Uyghurs in China and has written about the ongoing oppression of the ethnic group in China, such as through the Xinjiang internment camps.

Byler has a BA in History & Visual Journalism from Kent State University, an MA in East Asian Studies from Columbia University, and a PhD in Socio-Cultural Anthropology from the University of Washington.
Prior to joining Simon Fraser University, he conducted postdoctoral research at the University of Colorado.

Byler has worked as an advisor with faculty members and researchers at the University of British Columbia and Simon Fraser University to build the Xinjiang Documentation Project, a project that documents the ongoing Uyghur genocide. His research has been supported by Columbia University's Global Reports series and a Luce Foundation and American Council of Learned Societies Early Career Fellowship.

Byler has been frequently attacked by Chinese state media, who have accused him of being an agent of the United States government, which Byler has denied. The Global Times, a newspaper run by the Chinese Communist Party (CCP), has accused Byler of being an "anti-China figure" who makes "fabricated" allegations about "genocide and crimes against humanity" in Xinjiang.

Books
Terror Capitalism: Uyghur Dispossession and Masculinity in a Chinese City (Duke University Press, 2021)
In the Camps: China's High-Tech Penal Colony (Columbia University Global Reports, 2021)
 Xinjiang Year Zero with Ivan Franceschini and Nicholas Loubere (ANU Press, 2022)

References

American anthropologists

Living people

Year of birth missing (living people)
Academic staff of Simon Fraser University
Central Asian studies scholars
Uyghur human rights activists